The 2022 Central League Climax Series (CLCS)  was a set of two consecutive playoff series in Nippon Professional Baseball (NPB). The First Stage began on October 8 and the Final Stage concluded on October 14. The First Stage was a best-of-three series between the second-place Yokohama DeNA BayStars and the third-place Hanshin Tigers. The Final Series was a best-of-six with the Tokyo Yakult Swallows, the Central League champion, being awarded a one-win advantage against the Tigers, the winner of the First Stage. The Tokyo Yakult Swallows advanced to face the 2022 Pacific League Climax Series winner in the 2022 Japan Series with a 4-0 sweep of the Tigers.

First stage

Summary

Game 1

Game 2

Game 3

Final stage

Summary

Game 1

Game 2

Game 3

References

Climax Series
Central League Climax Series
Central League Climax Series